The 1963 Bowling Green Falcons football team was an American football team that represented Bowling Green State University in the Mid-American Conference (MAC) during the 1963 NCAA University Division football season. In their ninth season under head coach Doyt Perry, the Falcons compiled an 8–2 record (4–2 against MAC opponents), finished in third place in the MAC, and outscored opponents by a combined total of 201 to 116.

The team's statistical leaders included Jerry Ward with 858 passing yards, Jay Cunningham with 539 rushing yards, and Tom Sims with 177 receiving yards.

Schedule

References

Bowling Green
Bowling Green Falcons football seasons
Bowling Green Falcons football